Kannada cinema produces films in Kannada language. The 1965 film Satya Harishchandra was the first Kannada film to cross 1 crore. The 1995 film Om was the first Kannada film to cross 10 crores. Mungaru Male was the first Kannada film to cross 50 crores. Raajakumara was the first Kannada movie to cross ₹75 crore mark. K.G.F: Chapter 1 was the first Kannada film to gross ₹100, ₹150, ₹200 and ₹250 crore. Its sequel K.G.F: Chapter 2 was the first Kannada film to gross ₹500, ₹750, ₹1000 and ₹1250 crore.

List of highest-grossing films worldwide

List of highest-grossing films by year

Note: Since there are no official figures for gross collections of Kannada movies, only releases since 1970 which were mentioned as highest grossers of the year in majority of the sources, have been considered for this section:

Time line of highest grossing films
The films with a minimum worldwide gross of ₹10 crore are only considered.

Records

Biggest opening day collections
The films with a worldwide gross of ₹10 crore or more are considered.

List of highest-grossing films by month

Highest footfalls for Kannada films

List of highest grossing Kannada films on opening week

List of highest grossing Kannada films by adjusted inflation

List of highest-grossing film franchises
NOTE: Since Kannada film collection figures have no certain sources, figures are provided on the basis of many sources. Though figures contradict with some reliable sources in some cases, figures which are cited in most sources are only described .

See also
 List of highest-grossing Indian films
 List of highest-grossing South Indian films
 List of highest-grossing films in India

Notes

References

Kannada cinema
Lists of highest-grossing films by region